The Space Environment Information System (SPENVIS) is an ESA operational software developed and maintained at Belgian Institute for Space Aeronomy since 1996. It provides a web-based interface for assessing the Space environment and its effects on spacecraft systems and crews. The system is used by an international user community for various purposes, e.g. mission analysis and planning, educational support, and running models for scientific applications. SPENVIS also includes extensive background information on the space environment and the environment models.

References

External links
SPENVIS home page

European Space Agency